Isaac Stout House is a historic home located at Williams Township, Northampton County, Pennsylvania.  The original section of the house was built about 1772, and is a -story, five bay by two bay stone structure in the Georgian style. The original section measures approximately 40 feet wide and 30 feet deep. The interior has a center hall plan and has Federal style details. An addition was completed in 2001.  Also on the property are the ruins of a 19th-century bank barn and stone and stucco-faced silo.

It was added to the National Register of Historic Places in 2004.

References

Houses on the National Register of Historic Places in Pennsylvania
Georgian architecture in Pennsylvania
Houses completed in 1772
Houses in Northampton County, Pennsylvania
National Register of Historic Places in Northampton County, Pennsylvania